Herlinde Beutlhauser (born 23 November 1936) is an Austrian alpine skier. She competed in the women's downhill at the 1960 Winter Olympics.

References

1936 births
Living people
Austrian female alpine skiers
Olympic alpine skiers of Austria
Alpine skiers at the 1960 Winter Olympics
Sportspeople from Salzburg (state)